Sène (many variations: Sene, Seen, pronounced Sene, or long: Seen) is a Serer patronym in Senegal.

People
Personalities with this surname include:

Yandé Codou Sène, (1932-1910) Senegalese singer 
Oumar Sène, (1959) a former football midfielder
Fama Diagne Sène, (1969) Senegalese writer

References

Serer surnames